Baby for Sale is a 2004 television film that was premiered on the Lifetime Network on 12 July 2004. It stars Dana Delany and was directed by Peter Svatek. The filming took place in Montreal, Quebec, Canada. The story is based on true life events

Cast
 Dana Delany as Nathalie Johnson
 Hart Bochner as Steve Johnson
 Bruce Ramsay as Gabor Szabo
 Romano Orzari as Joey Perrotta
 Elizabeth Marleau as Janka
 Ellen David as Kathy Williamson
 Claudia Besso as Laura Jackson

Reception
Andy Webb from "The Movie Scene" gave the film three out of five stars and wrote: "What this all boils down to is that "Baby for Sale" typically has an interesting true story but just as typically for a Lifetime movie comes up short on realism and subtlety making it very much a movie for a certain type of audience who don't require gritty realism to be entertained." Robert Pardi from TV Guide gave it two out of four stars.

References

External links
 
 Baby for Sale at MyLifetime.com
 Baby for Sale at The New York Times

2004 television films
2004 films
Canadian drama television films
English-language Canadian films
Lifetime (TV network) films
Films directed by Peter Svatek
American drama television films
2000s American films
2000s Canadian films